Albion Park Rail is a suburb of  Shellharbour, Australia situated in the Macquarie Valley (Shellharbour).  The South Coast railway line was opened to the railway station and Bombo in 1887.  At the time the nearest town was Albion Park, several kilometres away.  Over time, houses were built around the railway station, and Albion Park Rail developed into a town in its own right, and with its own name.

Albion Park Rail has a community area set up with a community centre, playing fields and a recently built skatepark.  It only has one school but it accommodates many students from Pre-School to Year 6. Albion Park Rail is located along the shores of Lake Illawarra, near Koona Bay. It is a fifteen-minute drive on the freeway to Wollongong.

Albion Park Rail is the site of the Illawarra Regional Airport which is the location of the Historical Aircraft Restoration Society.

Heritage listings
Albion Park Rail has a number of heritage-listed sites, including:
 Princes Highway: Albion Park railway station

Museum 
The Illawarra Light Railway Museum located just south of the airport is dedicated to the preservation and display of historic light railway locomotives and rolling stock.  It holds regular open days featuring light and miniature train rides.

References

External links 
 Illawarra Light Railway Museum Society Homepage

 
City of Shellharbour
Suburbs of Wollongong